Hewlett House may refer to:

in the United States
(by state then town)
 Hewlett-Packard House and Garage, Palo Alto, California, listed on the National Register of Historic Places (NRHP), in Santa Clara County
 R. Buckminster Fuller and Anne Hewlett Dome Home, Carbondale, Illinois, NRHP-listed
Hewlett House (Cold Spring Harbor, New York), NRHP-listed, in Suffolk County
 Lester F. and Margaret Stewart Hewlett Ranch House, Woodland, Utah, NRHP-listed in Summit County
 Verner O. Hewlett Ranch House, Woodland, Utah, NRHP-listed in Summit County
 Stewart-Hewlett Ranch Dairy Barn, Woodland, Utah, NRHP-listed in Summit County